Skenea victori is a species of minute sea snail, a marine gastropod mollusk in the family Skeneidae.

Description
The size of the shell attains 1 mm.

Distribution
This species occurs in the Atlantic Ocean off Madeira, the Savage Islands and the Canary Islands.

References

 Segers W., Swinnen F. & De Prins R., 2009. Marine Molluscs of Madeira. Snoeck Publishers, Heule, Belgium, 612 p.

victori
Gastropods described in 2009